Pieter Corneliszoon Hooft (16 March 1581 – 21 May 1647) - Knight in the Order of Saint Michael - was a Dutch historian, poet and playwright who lived during the Dutch Golden Age in literature.

Life

Pieter Corneliszoon Hooft, often abbreviated to P.C. Hooft, was born in Amsterdam as the son of the town's mayor, Cornelis Hooft. Hooft was also uncle to Cornelis and Andries de Graeff.

In 1598, in preparation for his career as a merchant, his father sent him to France and Italy, but Pieter Corneliszoon Hooft was more interested in art and was deeply impressed by the Italian renaissance.

In 1609, he was appointed bailiff of Muiden and the Gooiland. He founded the Muiderkring, a literary society located at his home, the Muiderslot, the castle of Muiden, in which he got to live due to his appointment as sheriff of Muiden. Among the members were the poets and playwrights Constantijn Huygens, Maria Tesselschade, G.A. Bredero and Joost van den Vondel, as well as the Portuguese singer Francisca Duarte. Hooft, Bredero, and Vondel were also founders of the First Nederduytsche Academy.

Work
Hooft was a prolific writer of plays, poems and letters, but  from 1618 onwards he concentrated on writing a history of the Netherlands (Nederduytsche Historiën), inspired by Roman historian Tacitus. His focus was primarily on the Eighty Years' War between the Netherlands and Spain and though he tried to be as impartial as possible, he did succeed.

As a poet, he was influenced by his Renaissance contemporaries in France and Italy.

Plays

 Geeraerdt van Velsen ( 1613)
 Achilles en Polyxena (1614)
 Theseus en Ariane (1614)
 Granida (1615)
 Warenar (1616)
 Baeto, oft oorsprong der Holanderen (1626)

Poems
 Emblemata amatoria: afbeeldingen van minne (1611)

History
 Nederduytsche Historiën (1642-1656)

Present-day legacy
In present-day Amsterdam, Pieter Corneliszoon Hooft gives his name to P.C. Hooftstraat, the city's main destination for expensive designer clothes shopping. The south-western end of P. C. Hooftstraat runs into the city's main park, the Vondelpark, named for his friend Joost van den Vondel (see Life above). In many other Dutch cities, there are other streets named after Hooft, many of them also called P. C. Hooftstraat or Pieter C. Hooftstraat.

In 1947, 300 years after P.C. Hooft died in The Hague, a literary prize in his name was instituted by the Dutch government. An independent foundation annually awards the prize. Initially it was awarded for specific works, but in recent years it is awarded based on the entire collection of a writer.

Gallery

References

External links

 Works of Hooft in the Laurens Janszoon Coster project (Dutch)
 P.C. Hooft (1581-1647) - pictures of P.C. Hooft
 
 
 

1581 births
1647 deaths
17th-century Dutch dramatists and playwrights
17th-century Dutch poets
Dutch Golden Age writers
17th-century Dutch historians
Dutch male poets
Dutch male dramatists and playwrights
Muiderkring
Writers from Amsterdam